The 2018 UCI Cyclo-cross World Championships were the World Championship for cyclo-cross for the season 2017–18. These were held in Valkenburg in the Netherlands on Saturday 3 and Sunday 4 February 2018. The championships featured five events; men's races for elite, under-23 and junior riders, and women's races for elite and under-23 riders.

Schedule

Saturday 3 February 2018
 11:00 Men's Junior
 13:00 Women's Under 23
 15:00 Women's Elite

Sunday 4 February 2018
 11:00 Men's Under 23
 15:00 Men's Elite

All times in local time (UTC+1).

Participants

Medal summary

Medalists

Medals table

References

External links
 

Uci Cyclo-cross World Championships, 2018
UCI Cyclo-cross World Championships
2018 in Dutch sport
Cycle races in the Netherlands
International sports competitions hosted by the Netherlands
UCI Cyclo-cross World Championships